Tanga Region (Mkoa wa Tanga in Swahili) is one of Tanzania's 31 administrative regions. The region is comparable in size to the combined land area of the nation state of Burundi. The regional capital is the municipality of Tanga city. Located in northeast Tanzania, the region is bordered by Kenya and Kilimanjaro Region to the north; Manyara Region to the west; and Morogoro and Pwani Regions to the south. It has a coastline to the east with the Indian Ocean. According to the 2012 national census, the region had a population of 2,045,205.

History
The region was previously known as Tanga Province and included Same and Mwanga Districts that are at present in Kilimanjaro Region.

Geography

Geology and terrain 
An area occupying 3% of the country. In comparison Tanga is larger than the African nation of Burundi  at 25,680 square kilometers. The Tanga Region shares land borders with four other regions and three regions across the Pemba Channel namely; Pemba North Region, Pemba South Region and Zanzibar North. Tanga northwestern area is of high elevation, home to the Usambara Mountains with Tanga Region's highest point being Chambolo peak at 2,289 meters above sea level. The largest and longest river in Tanga Region is the Pangani River, fed by the Umkomazi River, Soni River and the Lwengera River. Tanga Region is located between 4 and 6 degrees south of the Equator. Another major river, the Mligasi River forms the southern border between Pwani Region and Tanga Region. Tanga Region is also home to largest cave system in East Africa, the Amboni Caves located a few kilometers north of Tanga city.

Flora and Fauna 
Tanga is home to rich biodiversity of plants and animals. Tanga Region is home to two major national parks, Mkomazi National Park, shared with southern Kilimanjaro Region. The park is home to the endangered Black rhinoceros and the African wild dog. The second national park in Tanga Region is the Saadani National Park, The only national park in the country that shares an ocean coastline. 

In the northwestern portion of the region is the Usambara mountains with the Amani Nature Reserve, home to the endemic fauna such as Amani Forest Tree Frog and Usambara torrent frog. In the forest, rare bird species like the Usambara eagle-owl, Usambara weaver, Usambara thrush and the Usambara double-collared sunbird are found. In addition, rare reptiles such as Usambara dwarf gecko, and endangered mammals such as the Usambara shrew are also found in the mountains. Just off the coast of Tanga is home to the Coelacanth. Tanga has one of the largest protected marine parks, Tanga Coelacanth Marine Park . The endangered Dugong is found off the coast in Mkinga District near Kirui Island.

Climate 
Tanga Region has a tropical savanna climate with the Köppen climate classification of 49 and Aw. Western Tanga on the Handeni plateau is semi-arid and dry. Where are the Usambara mountains share a more temperate climate. Tanga Region receives annual precipitation level of 1,100 to 1,400 millimeters, often raining in April to May during the Wet season. Western Tanga Region gets less annual rainfall at 600mm annually, whilst some parts of the Usambara mountains receive up to 2,000mm annually. The average temperature range during the hot months of December to March is a high of 32 and a low of 26 degrees C. In comparison, the average temperature range during the cooler months of May to October is a high of 28 and a low of 20 degrees C.

Demographics

Population 
Tanga Region's population in 2012 was around 2,045,205. Lushoto District having the highest population of 492,441. Pangani District has the lowest population of 54,025. Tanga is home to around six major indigenous ethic groups.  It is the ancestral home to the Bondei people located on the central east coast of the Tanga Region, the majority in Pangani district and Muheza District. Most of western Tanga is home to the Zigula people, the majority in Handeni District.

The Sambaa, the largest ethic group in Tanga Region are mostly found in the northern Tanga Region in the western Usambaras, Lushoto district, western Korogwe District and northern Muheza district. The Digo people and the Segeju people are a small minority within Mkinga District in the northeastern Tanga Region. Lastly the Ngulu people are native on the southwestern corner of Tanga Region's Kilindi District.  Other smaller ethnic groups in Tanga Region include Mbugu and Pare people. More recently in history, immigrants from other parts of the country and abroad have found economic opportunities in Tanga Region, these include Indians, and Arabs.

Religious communities 
The majority of Tanga Region residents practice Sunni Islam with elements of African traditional faiths since the introduction of Islam to the Tangan coast through trade during the Swahili era in the 9th and 10th centuries.

Economy

Agriculture 
Tanga is one of East Africa's largest agricultural producers, especially Citrus fruits. Agriculture is the biggest employer in Tanga Region. The coastal belt 0-15m above sea level covers most of Pangani district, a small coastal strip of Muheza district, Tanga and Mkinga districts. Crops grown in this Tanga coastal belt are coconuts, sisal, cashews, maize, cassava, rice and seaweed. Crops grown in the wet plains of Tanga are similar to the coastal belt minus the seaweed, but include cotton.

Administrative divisions

Districts
Tanga Region is divided into eleven districts, each administered by a council:

Notable people 
 John Kijazi, Tanzanian politician
 Mbegha, 19th Century Sambaa King.
 Kimweri ye Nyumbai, 19th Century Sambaa King.
 Kimweri Mputa Magogo, Last Shambaa King of the Kilindi dynasty.
 Shabaan bin Robert, National Poet of Tanzania.
 Kleist Sykes, Political activist, one of the founding fathers of Tanganyika.
 Abdi Banda, Tanzanian football player.
 Sudhar Bhuchar,  British actor.
 Ronald V. Clarke, British criminologist
 Gadiel Kamagi, Tanzanian football player
 Bashir Khanbhai, British politician
 Rashid Matumla, Tanzanian boxer
 Michael Riegels, British barrister
 Hassan Mwakinyo, Tanzanian boxer

References

External links

 
 Tanga Region Socio-Economic Profile

 
Regions of Tanzania
Tanga, Tanzania